Arcángel & De La Ghetto are an American reggaeton duo, consisting of Austin "Arcángel" Santos and Rafael "De La Ghetto" Castillo.

Arcángel and De La Ghetto duo began when they met in a studio in San Juan, Puerto Rico. After many hits and shows, they decided to break up the duo and pursue their talents as solo artists. They still make songs together on occasion but are no longer a duo. After launching his career and gaining notability, De La Ghetto collaborated with J Balvin, Reykon, Yelsid, Zion, Daddy Yankee, Héctor el Father, Jowell & Randy, Don Omar, Tito El Bambino, Ivy Queen, Yaga & Mackie, Tego Calderón, Ñejo & Dalmata, Alexis & Fido, and Julio Voltio, among others. De La Ghetto became known in 2005 with the single "Ven Pégate", a duet with Arcángel on the reggaeton compilation Sangre Nueva, which opened doors allowing him to participate in later reggaeton compilation albums.

Discography

Studio albums 
 2007: Las Nuevas Amenazas

Collaborative albums 
 2007: Flow Factory (with Zion)

Mixtapes 
 2006: La Factoría del Flow, Vol. 1 (with Zion)
 2006: La Factoría del Flow, Vol. 2
 2007: La Factoría del Flow, Vol. 3

Singles 
 2006: "Ella Quiere"
 2007: "Sorpresa"
 2007: "Aparentemente" (feat. Yaga & Mackie)
 2013: "Flow Violento (remix)"
 2013: "Sincero Amor (remix)"
 2014: "Estamo' Aquí"
 2016: "Me Enamoré de la Glock"
 2016: "Rosé"
 2017: "Más Que Ayer"

References

External links 
 Arcángel at Myspace
 De La Ghetto at Myspace

Reggaeton duos
Musical groups established in 2004
Puerto Rican musical duos
Puerto Rican reggaeton musicians